The  was a three-ship class of composite hulled, sail-and-steam corvettes of the early Imperial Japanese Navy.

Design and description
The Katsuragi vessels were designed as iron-ribbed, wooden-hulled, three-masted barque-rigged sloops-of-war, with a basic design based on experience gained in building  and  sloops. The planking was a combination of teak and native keyaki wood.
They displaced  at normal load. The crew numbered about 231 officers and enlisted men.

Propulsion was by a coal-fired double-expansion reciprocating steam engine with six cylindrical boilers driving a double screw.

The Katsuragi-class ships were armed with two Krupp  Krupp breech-loading guns, five  Krupp breech-loading guns, one  Krupp QF gun, four quadruple 1-inch Nordenfelt guns and  torpedo tubes. A major improvement over previous Japanese corvette designs was the use of recessed gun ports, which allowed the two forward guns to fire on a forward arc instead of only on a broadside.

The design for the Katsuragi-class ships was by British-educated Japanese naval architect Sasō Sachū, director of the Yokosuka Naval Arsenal. Two of the three vessels (Katsuragi and Musashi) were built at Yokosuka, and one (Yamato) by built by the private-contractor, Onohama Shipyards in Kobe (a predecessor of Hitachi Zosen Corporation).
In late 1900, the ships were extensively refitted, during which time their sail rigging was removed, and armament changed to eight QF 2.5 pdr guns and six quadruple 1-inch Nordenfelt guns. The torpedoes were upgraded from 15 inch to 18-inch torpedo tubes. However, during the Russo-Japanese War, the ships were regarded as obsolete and were assigned as guard ships in ports in the Japanese home islands.

In 1907, the armament was changed again, this time to four 3-inch and two 2.5-inch guns, and the ships were reclassified as survey ships or as a second-class coastal patrol vessels. Katsuragi was removed from the navy list on 11 April 1913, and Musashi on 1 April 1928. Yamato was removed from the navy list 1 April 1935, but survived as a floating prison until the end of World War II.

Ships

Notes

References

External links

Corvette classes
 
Screw sloops of the Imperial Japanese Navy